Ķoņi Parish is an administrative unit of Valmiera Municipality in the Vidzeme region of Latvia.

Notable residents 
 Gustav Klutsis
 Kārlis Kalniņš

Parishes of Latvia
Valmiera Municipality
Vidzeme